Kura is a Local Government Area in Kano State, Nigeria. Its headquarters are in the town of Kura on the A2 highway.

It has an area of 206 km and a population of 144,601 at the 2006 census.

The postal code of the area is 711.

References

Local Government Areas in Kano State